Alex Greaves is a retired British flat racing jockey

She was the first woman to win a Group 1 horse race in Great Britain when she dead-heated in the 1997 Nunthorpe Stakes at York on Ya Malak. She became the first female apprentice to ride out her claim and partnered around 300 winners in a 15-year career.

She was married to the late racehorse trainer, Dandy Nicholls.

Major wins 
 Great Britain
Nunthorpe Stakes - Ya Malak (1997 (dh))

References 

British female jockeys
English jockeys